Alexandra Borgia is a fictional character, played by Annie Parisse, who appeared on the long-running NBC drama series Law & Order from 2005 to 2006. Appearing in a total of 33 episodes, she is the shortest serving Assistant District Attorney (ADA) in the show's history.

Fictional character biography
Borgia first appears in the episode "Fluency", having been appointed by DA Arthur Branch (Fred Thompson) as a replacement for Serena Southerlyn (Elisabeth Röhm). She principally assists Jack McCoy (Sam Waterston), but she also conducts detailed investigations, arraignments and hearings independent of McCoy and Branch. Prior to her last appointment, Borgia was engaged in trying drug cases. She is respected among her colleagues for her intelligence and adroit manner in preparing a case for prosecution. When asked by Detective Joe Fontana (Dennis Farina) if her name is Italian, she replies that it is from Italy, France and Spain and that she has relatives in Venice. She is a Christian and regularly goes to church.

Unlike her predecessor, Borgia often agrees with the decisions of her superiors and follows their directions regardless of her own views. She shares many parallels with Abbie Carmichael (Angie Harmon), including the latter's conservatism and cooperation with the police in developing cases. Borgia also has a penchant for investigative work, a trait shared by Paul Robinette (Richard Brooks), whom she opposes in a case in the Season 16 episode "Birthright".

Borgia has a professional manner, balancing compassion for victims with adherence to legal rules and procedure. This is evident in her dealings with the mother of a victim of faulty influenza vaccine during her first case. The prosecution decides to drop the case among the numerous charges against the defendant, as it is too weak to use. Borgia impulsively promises the mother that the defendant will be severely punished. Although McCoy fulfills that promise by arranging multiple consecutive manslaughter sentences (adding up to 240 years in prison), he orders Borgia to never again make similar promises. Her compassion also helps her to get close to victims' families, as demonstrated when she bonds with a murder victim's son over their shared love of fishing. She is also respectful and polite in her dealings with colleagues. Simultaneously, she is never afraid to engage in heated byplay with defendants and convicts alike to ensure a successful prosecution. Borgia indicates her devout Catholicism as a factor in her belief in the religious transformation of a defendant and in arguing with her superiors, she also highlights her belief in a Christian ideal of forgiveness. Her Catholic background also influences her opposition to torture.

Borgia was the shortest-appearing Assistant District Attorney in the history of the Law & Order franchise, seen only in 33 episodes. In her final episode, while investigating a family's murder, the DA's office focuses on the husband, Frank Andreas (Bruce MacVittie), who is supplying killers with fake DEA badges which they use to commit home invasion robberies. Borgia presses Andreas to give up his accomplices, and is later kidnapped from her own apartment.  Her body is subsequently found in the trunk of an abandoned car, bound, brutally beaten and dead of asphyxiation after choking on her own vomit. Outraged, McCoy arranges a sham prosecution to make sure her murderers go to prison for life, skirting legal ethics to the point that he almost faces disbarment and is replaced by a special prosecutor. Borgia's position is filled by Connie Rubirosa (Alana de la Garza) beginning in season 17.

Credits 
Parisse is credited in a total of 33 episodes of the Law & Order as Alexandra Borgia.

References

Fictional assistant district attorneys
Fictional lawyers
Fictional Republicans (United States)
Law & Order characters
Television characters introduced in 2005
American female characters in television
Fictional murdered people
ja:アレクサンドラ・ボルジア
pt:Alexandra Borgia